Therese Ritchie (born 11 April 1961) is an Australian contemporary artist, writer and graphic designer, based in Darwin in the Northern Territory.

Career 
Ritchie was born in Newcastle in New South Wales. After moving to the Northern Territory, she completed a Diploma of Arts and Bachelor of Fine Arts from the Northern Territory University now Charles Darwin University (CDU) in 1985. She was then awarded a Masters in Visual Arts from CDU in 2005. She co-founded established GreenAnt Research Arts and Publishing in the 1990s and her own commercial graphic design business, Black Dog Graphics.

Her work provides a rich social and political commentary and sometimes controversial representations of life in the Northern Territory.

It is featured in the collections of the National Gallery of Australia, Museum and Art Gallery of the Northern Territory, Araluen Arts Centre, Gallery of Modern Art Queensland, Artbank, Flinders University and Charles Darwin University.

Selected work 
Ritchie produced a range of publications and exhibitions known as LittlePricks from 2012 to 2014 featuring work by many Top End artists in response to comments by Rob Knight, the then Northern Territory Minister for Young Territorians, who called Indigenous children "little pricks" for burning the Australian flag during the Australia Day demonstrations in Canberra.

She collaborated with artists from the Borroloola region in 2016 on Open Cut: Jacky Green, Sean Kerins, Therese Ritchie an exploration of the complex relationship between Aboriginal people and the mining companies working on their land.

A retrospective of her work with renown artist Chips Mackinolty, Not Dead Yet, was exhibited at the CDU Art Gallery in 2010. A solo retrospective Burning Hearts was exhibited at the Museum and Art Gallery of the Northern Territory in 2019.

References

External links 

 

1961 births
Living people
20th-century Australian women artists
21st-century Australian women artists
Australian graphic designers
Charles Darwin University alumni
20th-century Australian artists
21st-century Australian artists
Artists from the Northern Territory
People from Darwin, Northern Territory